North Palisade is the third-highest mountain in the Sierra Nevada range of California, and one of the state's small number of peaks over 14,000 feet, known as fourteeners. It is the highest peak of the Palisades group of peaks in the central part of the Sierra range. It sports a small glacier (the Palisade Glacier) and several highly prized rock climbing routes on its northeast side.

History 
North Palisade has a collection of names from the 19th century. The Wheeler Survey referred to it as Northwest Palisade in 1878. The following year, Lilbourne A. Winchell called it Dusy's Peak after local rancher Frank Dusy. In 1895, Bolton Brown advocated yet another name, after David Starr Jordan.  In 2009, U.S. Senator Dianne Feinstein, supported by U.S. Senator Barbara Boxer, introduced legislation to rename the peak as "Brower Palisade", in honor of environmentalist David Brower. There was significant opposition to this proposal.

The first ascent was made on July 25, 1903, by  James S. Hutchinson, Joseph Nisbet LeConte and James K. Moffitt. They approached the area overland from south of the Palisades, and scouted possible routes from the summits of Marion Peak and Mount Sill. Armed with this intelligence, they planned to ascend the southwest chute of the U Notch, and find a way to bypass the rock face between the notch and the upper reaches of North Palisade. Around , they followed a northward branch of this chute, and slowly climbed a difficult system of cracks. From here they found a catwalk ledge that took them to a series of icy gullies, bound toward the summit. These gullies were blocked by a pair of chockstones, requiring class 4 moves to pass. Beyond these obstacles, they crested the southeast ridge, and climbed a series of granite blocks to the summit.

After making this climb, LeConte is quoted as writing in a letter, "I have called the peak merely the North Palisade. Put Dusy's name on some less imposing mass, and give us a name to be handed down through all time."
The peak has been called North Palisade since that day, and received official recognition by the U.S. Board on Geographic Names.

Subsidiary peaks
North Palisade has several named subsidiary peaks (nearby peaks which have less than 300 ft (91 m) of topographic prominence). These all lie on the main ridge crest, and are as follows:
 Polemonium Peak, 14,080+ ft (4,294+ m). Prominence of 160 feet (49 m). This lies between the "U-Notch" and "V-Notch" couloirs (popular snow/ice climbs), 0.15 mi (0.25 km) east-southeast of North Palisade. Named on the USGS topographic map. The peak is named for the Polemonium eximium skypilot (plant) found in the area.
 Starlight Peak, . This is the northwest summit of North Palisade, less than 0.1 mi (0.15 km) from the main summit. Some climbing routes end atop this peak known for its famous "Milk Bottle", a  pillar of rock with huge exposure.
 Thunderbolt Peak, . About 0.25 mi (0.4 km) northwest of North Palisade. Named on the USGS topographic map. The Sierra Club guidebook notes: "This was the last 14,000 foot (4,267 m) peak to be climbed in the Sierra. During a wild storm on the first ascent, a bolt of lightning left Jules Eichorn severely shaken; hence the name".

See also
 List of mountain peaks of California
 List of highest points in California by county
 The Palisades of the Sierra Nevada
 List of California fourteeners

References

External links
 
 
 

Fourteeners of California
Highest points of United States national parks
Mountains of Kings Canyon National Park
Mountains of the John Muir Wilderness
Mountains of Inyo County, California
Mountains of Fresno County, California
North American 4000 m summits
Mountains of Northern California